Ander Mirambell Viñas (born 17 February 1983) is a Spanish skeleton racer who has competed since 2005. He is Spain's first skeleton athlete. His best World Cup finish was 14th in the men's event at Whistler in November 2010.

Mirambell's best finish at the FIBT World Championships was 22nd in the men's event in 2013.

He participated in the 2010 Winter Olympics, where he finished in 24th place.

In 2014 he published a book, Rompiendo el hielo (English: Breaking the Ice).

Olympic results

World Championships results

References

External links

 
 
 

1983 births
Living people
Olympic skeleton racers of Spain
Skeleton racers at the 2010 Winter Olympics
Skeleton racers at the 2014 Winter Olympics
Skeleton racers at the 2018 Winter Olympics
Skeleton racers at the 2022 Winter Olympics
Spanish male skeleton racers
Sportspeople from the Province of Barcelona
People from Calella
20th-century Spanish people
21st-century Spanish people